Fruid is a small reservoir in the Scottish Borders area of Scotland, UK, near Menzion. It is formed by damming the Fruid Water, and supplements the contents of Talla Reservoir, forming part of the water supply for Edinburgh.

The construction of the reservoir flooded the valley, inundating several farmhouses including Hawkshaw. Playwright Peter Moffat had ancestors that previously lived in the area now covered by water and cites the location as inspiration for The Village.

See also
Baddinsgill Reservoir
Megget Reservoir
Talla Reservoir
West Water Reservoir
List of reservoirs and dams in the United Kingdom

References

Reservoirs in the Scottish Borders